Rena Kanokogi (née Glickman; July 30, 1935 – November 21, 2009) was a renowned Jewish-American judo expert. In 1959, disguised as a man, she won a medal at a YMCA judo tournament, but had to return it after acknowledging that she was a woman. Traveling to Japan to continue her judo training, Kanokogi became the first woman allowed to train in the men's group at the Kodokan. She is perhaps best known for pioneering women's judo competition at the Olympic Games. Rusty is often referred to as, "The Mother of Women's Judo".

Early life
Kanokogi was born in Brooklyn, New York. The family home in Coney Island was not a stable one, and she began working in various jobs at the age of seven. In her adolescence, she led a street gang known as the Apaches. Her mother sold hot dogs for a living. In the 1950s, she used her brother's weights for weight training and also worked out on the punching bag at the gymnasium. By the mid-1950s, Kanokogi had married for the first time, becoming Rena Stewart. She bore a son, Chris Stewart, who would later add his stepfather's surname, Kanokogi, to his own name. Kanokogi and her first husband divorced after a short period of marriage. She was working as a switchboard operator at this time.

In 1955, a male friend showed Kanokogi a judo technique that he had learned, and she immediately became interested in the martial art. Kanokogi recalled that she was attracted to the art because it calmed her down and helped her develop self-control. She learned judo in her local neighborhood and tried to fight in judo competitions, but was barred because she was a woman. She acquired the nickname "Rusty" after a local stray dog.

Judo career
In 1959, Kanokogi competed at the YMCA judo championship in Utica, New York, disguised as a man. Women were not explicitly barred from the competition, but no woman had ever tried to participate before and there was no place on the tournament application to indicate gender. She had cut her hair short, and taped down her breasts. She was an alternate on her team, and had to step in when a male member was injured and unable to compete. She won the match against her opponent and her team won the contest, but she was then pulled aside and the tournament organizer asked her whether she was a woman. She nodded, and was stripped of her medal.

In 1962, with no further options for her development in the US, Kanokogi traveled to the Kodokan in Tokyo, Japan. Women had trained in the Kodokan since 1926, but in their own groups (not in the same groups as men). After "pulverizing" the other students in the women's training group, she became the first woman allowed to train in the men's group at the Kodokan. She was promoted to the rank of 2nd dan while at the Kodokan. There, she met her future husband, Ryohei Kanokogi, who held black belt status in judo, karate, and jodo, and was on the Nichidai University judo team. The couple married in 1964 in New York. At the time, he was ranked 5th dan and she was ranked 2nd dan. Kiyoshi Shiina, another judo master, was the best man at the Kanokogis' wedding.  She served as the coach for the US Women's National Team in 1976, which included one of the top women in the 1970s, Amy Kublin Delores Brodie, Maureen Braziel.

In 1965, Kanokogi directed the first junior judo tournament held in New York: the New York City YMCA Junior Judo Championships. The following year, she directed the New York Women's Invitational Shiai. In 1977, she organized on short notice a team of Jewish–American women to compete at the Maccabiah Games in Israel.

In 1980, Kanokogi organized the first women's judo world championship in Madison Square Garden's Felt Forum, sponsoring it through the mortgage of her own home.  She was the driving force behind the introduction of women's judo at the 1988 Summer Olympics—she had threatened to sue the International Olympic Committee. In 1988, Kanokogi was Coach of the first United States Olympic Women's Judo Team.  She would coach her personal student Margaret Castro to a medal at these Olympic Games.  In 1991, she was inducted into the International Women's Sports Hall of Fame. She was the first woman to be promoted to the rank of 7th dan in judo.

Later life
At the 2004 Summer Olympics in Athens, Kanokogi was a commentator for NBC's coverage of judo. In 2008, she was awarded the Order of the Rising Sun, 4th Class (Gold Rays with Rosette), one of Japan's highest civilian honors. In April 2009, she was inducted into the International Jewish Sports Hall of Fame. In August that year, some 50 years after she had been stripped of her YMCA judo medal, the New York State YMCA awarded her a gold medal to honor her lifetime's work.

Kanokogi died on November 21, 2009, at the Lutheran Medical Center in New York, following a battle with multiple myeloma. She was survived by her husband, children Ted Kanokogi and Jean Kanokogi, and two grandchildren according to one newspaper article, as well as eldest son Chris Stewart Kanokogi and a third grandchild.

See also
 Judo at the 1988 Summer Olympics
 Keiko Fukuda
 List of judoka

References

External links
 JudoPhotos: Rusty Kanokogi contains photographs of Kanokogi (c. 1980).

1935 births
2009 deaths
Deaths from multiple myeloma
American expatriate sportspeople in Japan
American female judoka
Deaths from cancer in New York (state)
Deaths from leukemia
Jewish American sportspeople
Jewish martial artists
Competitors at the 1973 Maccabiah Games
Maccabiah Games judoka
Maccabiah Games competitors for the United States
Judoka trainers
People from Coney Island
Recipients of the Order of the Rising Sun, 4th class
20th-century American women
20th-century American Jews
21st-century American Jews
21st-century American women
Female-to-male cross-dressers